Czechoslovakia's Miloslav Mečíř defeated the United States' Tim Mayotte in the final, 3–6, 6–2, 6–4, 6–2, to win the gold medal in Men's Singles tennis at the 1988 Summer Olympics. It was Czechoslovakia's first medal at the event. The United States' Brad Gilbert and Sweden's Stefan Edberg won the bronze medals. It was Sweden's first men's singles Olympic medal.

The tournament was held at the Seoul Olympic Park Tennis Center in Seoul, South Korea. Tennis was officially re-introduced as an official sport in the 1988 Summer Olympics, after being held as a demonstration sport in the 1968 Olympic Games and 1984 Olympic Games. It was discontinued from being an official sport after the 1924 Olympic Games before its re-introduction. There were 64 competitors from 32 nations. Nations were limited to three players each (down from four before tennis's Olympic hiatus).

Background

This was the eighth (medal) appearance of the men's singles tennis event. The event has been held at every Summer Olympics where tennis has been on the program: from 1896 to 1924 and then from 1988 to the current program. Demonstration events were held in 1968 and 1984.

Number one seed and the favorite was Stefan Edberg of Sweden, the winner of the 1984 demonstration event as well as the reigning Wimbledon champion.

Bermuda, Brazil, West Germany, Haiti, Israel, the Ivory Coast, New Zealand, Nigeria, Paraguay, Poland, South Korea, the Soviet Union, and Zimbabwe each made their debut in the event. France made its seventh appearance, most among all nations, having missed only the 1904 event.

Competition format

The competition was a single-elimination tournament. Unlike previous Olympic tournaments, no bronze-medal match was held. All matches were best-of-five sets. The 12-point tie-breaker, common by 1988, was used in the Olympics for the first time.

Schedule

All times are Korea Standard Time adjusted for daylight savings (UTC+10)

Seeds

Draw

Finals

Top half

Section 1

Section 2

Bottom half

Section 3

Section 4

References

 ITF 1988 Summer Olympics Men's Singles Draw

Men's Singles
Men's events at the 1988 Summer Olympics